The Scout method is the informal educational system used in the Scouting Movement. The aim of Scouting is character training with the goal of helping participants become independent and helpful, and thereby become "healthy, happy, helpful citizens".

The Scout method uses appealing games in the primitive outdoors to generate challenges which a Scout learns to solve by themselves. Through the training and the example of the leader, Scouts are taught independence, leadership, the ambition to learn by themselves, and a moral code with positive goals. According to founder Robert Baden-Powell, the Scout method works naturally and unconsciously: naturally in the way that it follows the natural impulses of the Scout, and unconsciously because the Scout is not aware of the education.

Hands-on orientation provides a practical method of learning and helps the Scout build confidence. Activities and games provide a fun way to develop skills and provide contact with nature and the environment when pursued in an outdoor setting. Scouts learn in small groups to build unity and a family atmosphere. Developing the characteristics of responsibility, self-reliance, self-confidence, and readiness, the Scouts eventually learn collaboration and leadership skills. An attractive program of varying activities expands a Scout's horizons and bonds the Scout even more to the group.

World Organization of the Scout Movement

The World Organization of the Scout Movement's (WOSM) definition of the Scout method has changed over the years. Through the 1980s it was composed of four elements: Scout Law and Scout Promise (Scout Oath), learning by doing, development of small groups, and a progressive and attractive programs of different activities. This changed in the 1990s when WOSM restated the method in seven elements. At the 41st World Scout Conference in 2017, an eighth element was added, "community involvement". These eight elements are summarized here.

The World Association of Girl Guides and Girl Scouts uses a very similar, five-part method.

Law and promise

The Scout law is a personal code of living to guide the way each Scout lives his or her life. It is not a repression of faults, so was not framed as a list of prohibitions. It states what is good form and what is expected of a Scout. The Scout Law is at the heart of the Scout method. With the Scout promise a Scout is engaged to do his best to obey the Scout law. The main principles are:
 Duty to God
 Duty to others
 Duty to self

Prohibition
Scouting does not prohibit bad habits, but instead gives better alternatives that will absorb the Scout's attention and gradually lead him to forget the old habit. The reasoning is that "prohibition generally invites evasion, since it challenges the spirit inherent in every red-blooded boy. The boy is not governed by DON'T, but is led on by DO."

Spirituality
A Scout should be spiritual but Scouting is open to all religions. Scouting deals with religions in the practical way: by nature study (to see what God is) and helping others (which is what God asks for). According to Baden-Powell this is part of all religions. Scouting develops the spiritual side through teaching life-saving techniques and by promoting the daily good deed.

Good deeds

The good deed is a key component of the law and promise. Baden-Powell felt this is the main duty God asks for, and fulfilling our duty to others makes us happy, which fulfills the duty to ourselves. The point is not so much the deed itself, which could be minor, but to teach the Scout to always pay attention and recognise if he could help someone.

Scouts believe that education is a process of seeking and finding, this should be accomplished by planning and revisiting matters again in different contexts, presenting them to ourselves and working to keep operational 'activities' helping the boy scout find the idea and "experience the thrill of the real Good Turn.".

Learning by doing
Scouts games are full of practical action. This holds the participant's attention and gives the Scout hands-on experience in how the theory works. Although Baden-Powell put emphasis on practical work and independent learning, he did not rule out the need for instruction by leaders or in books. The phrase "Learning by doing" is nowadays much used in Scouting.

Team system

Patrol system

Sometimes called the 'patrol method.' Scouts are organised in small groups (about five to seven Scouts) because this is the natural way boys work together. These patrols are therefore more important than the Scout troop. Patrols must be kept intact under all circumstances, including working, tenting, learning, cooking, and surviving together. In a Patrol the Scouts learn to work with others, while the Patrol leader learns responsibility for others. Both have to give up part of their personal interest for this. However, Scouting deals with the individual, not with the company. A Scout has his own identity within the group and learns as an individual. The Patrol serves as the character school for the individual. Younger sections, such as Cub Scouts and Beaver Scouts, are divided into sixes (Cubs) or lodges (Beavers). While Beaver lodges have no leader structure, Cub sixes have a sixer and seconder.

Court of Honour
Called the "Patrol Leaders' Council" in some places. The Scout patrols are subject to a Court of Honour formed by the Patrol Leaders, with the Scout Leader as advisor. This is a peer system in which Scouts discuss each other's behaviour and is part of the self-governing aspect of Scouting.

Symbolic framework

Imagination
Scouting plays on the imagination of the Scout, who loves to "make-believe" and live in the imaginative world of adventurers, such as backwoodsmen, pioneers, sailors, and airmen. The Scout identifies with the personal qualities of his heroes. Drawing on his experience as an amateur actor, Baden-Powell built into Scouting a theatrical and non-serious environment, using words with strange meanings, yells, songs, and unique customs. The common uniform is also part of this theatre.

Rituals
Scouting has a number of rituals. They are designed to be short, simple, and attractive for Scouts, but with underlying symbolism.

Personal progression

Self-reliance
Baden-Powell wanted a Scout to learn to make his own decisions, as he felt this would help the children grow and mature. Baden-Powell wrote that a Scout should paddle his own canoe, metaphorically speaking. He should travel not in a rowing boat, with his back to where he goes, rowed by others and someone else at the rudder, but alone in a canoe: facing the future, paddling and steering by himself. Scouting teaches self-reliance by bringing the Scouts into a challenging, somewhat risky environment, without help in the direct neighbourhood. Therefore, the program is based on an adult, adventurous, and appealing outdoor life. "A man's job cut down to boy's size."

Self-governing
Giving responsibility to the Scouts is a keystone of the Scout method: "Expect him to carry out his charge faithfully. Don't keep prying to see how he does. Let him do it his own way. Let him come a howler over it if need be, but in any case leave him alone." The Patrol is almost independent, while the Troop is run by the Patrol Leaders in the Patrols' Leaders Council and Court of Honour.

Self-learning
Education in Scouting should give a Scout the ambition and desire to learn by himself, which is more valuable than receiving instruction from leaders. This is done by having the Scout undertake activities that attract him individually from the selection offered in Scouting for Boys.

Badge system
The "Personal Progressive Scheme" is based on two complementary elements:
 Proficiency (Merit) badges are intended to encourage the Scout to learn a subject which could be his work or hobby, and cover many different types of activities not always related to Scouting.
 Class badges or Progress system:
 Class badges are successive stages in which the Scout learns the techniques needed for the Scout game. An important final (first Class) test for the Scout or Guide section is making a journey on their own, proving their independence.
 The personal progress system was introduced by the World Organization of the Scout Movement as an alternative to the Class badges. The programme uses successive stages which young people go through in order to reach the educational objectives for each age group. The system puts more emphasis on personal objectives of physical, intellectual, affective, social, spiritual, and character development.
Badges are not a final goal, but a first step, to give a Scout encouragement. The Scout should then decide by himself to proceed if he likes the activity, without further need of standards. Scouting should not be a high standard of knowledge.

Non-competitive
Education in Scouting is non-competitive because Scouts should learn because they like the subject, not just in competition or to be better than others.

Individual
Education in Scouting is individual, because every Scout, no matter what their capabilities, must be inspired to learn. The goal is not the quality of the whole group. Scouts should proceed on their own level. The badges signify not a certain quality of knowledge or skill as "the amount of effort the Scout puts into his work." The standards were therefore purposely not clearly defined.

Nature

Nature as the learning school
The Scouting game mostly takes place in Nature, because it is an adventurous environment with challenges, which Scouts want to conquer. In this way the Scout and the Patrol learn to overcome difficulties and learn to make their own decisions.

God in nature
According to Baden-Powell, the Scout could find God in Nature when he realised the complexity and beauty of Nature.

Adult support

Example of the leader
An important part of Scouting education is the personal example of the leader. The Scout is impressed by the leader because of his age, his knowledge, and his position as a leader. If the leader is popular, leadership will be seen as an attractive goal, and the Scout will follow the example of the leader. The Scoutmaster living the Scout law will have more influence than one who simply talks about it. In the boys' eyes it is what a man does that counts and not so much what he says.

Guide
The self-governing of the boys changes the role of the leader: "I had stipulated that the position of Scoutmaster was to be neither that of a schoolmaster nor of a commander Officer, but rather that of an elder brother among his boys, not detached or above them individually, able to inspire their efforts and to suggest new diversions when his finger on their pulse told him the attraction of any present craze was wearing off." Scouting leaders should not direct, but guide (and check on safety).

Community Involvement
This refers to knowledge of and service to the various communities that a person is part of, local, national, and international.

Traditional Scouting
In Traditional Scouting, a "back-to-basics" approach to Scouting that aims to restore Baden-Powell's original model, the Scout Method is simpler.  It is defined as a system of progressive self-education through:
 Having a uniform, promise, and law;
 Learning by doing (hands-on training);
 Use of the Patrol System; and
 A progressive and stimulating program of varied activities based on the interests of the participants, including games, useful skills, and services in the community, and all taking place largely in an outdoor setting in contact with nature.

See also

 Scout Spirit
 Scoutcraft
 Educational progressivism

Notes

References

Scouting
Alternative education
Philosophy of education
Psychological attitude